The women's épée competition in fencing at the 2016 Summer Olympics in Rio de Janeiro was held on 6 August at the Carioca Arena 3.

For the victory ceremony the medals for the competition were presented by Claudia Bokel, Germany, member of the International Olympic Committee, and the gifts were presented by Giorgio Scarso, Vice President of the FIE.

Results

Finals

Top half

Section 1

Section 2

Bottom half

Section 3

Section 4

Results

References

Women's epee
2016 in women's fencing
Women's events at the 2016 Summer Olympics